Plamen Tenev (born 13 June 1995) is a Bulgarian footballer who currently plays as a defender for Zagorets.

Career
On 5 January 2018, Tenev signed a -year contract with Vereya.

In July 2018, Tenev moved to Tsarsko Selo.

After a year in Neftochimik, Tenev joined Lokomotiv GO.

Club statistics

Club

References

External links

Profile at beroe.bg

Living people
1995 births
Bulgarian footballers
Bulgaria under-21 international footballers
Association football defenders
PFC Beroe Stara Zagora players
PFC Spartak Pleven players
FC Vereya players
PFC Nesebar players
FC Tsarsko Selo Sofia players
Neftochimic Burgas players
FC Lokomotiv Gorna Oryahovitsa players
First Professional Football League (Bulgaria) players
Second Professional Football League (Bulgaria) players
People from Radnevo